Locomotiv GT V. is the fifth studio album by Hungarian rock band Locomotiv GT. It is the band's first double album, which was released in 1976 and was the last LGT album with drummer József Laux and the last featuring lyricist Anna Adamis. The album was banned due to Laux' immigration to the United States, which was illegal at the time.

Track listing

Side One
"Csak az jöjjön" (Gábor Presser, József Laux) - 0:30
"A kicsi, a nagy, az Artúr és az Indián" (Presser, Anna Adamis) - 4:38
"Rajongás" (János Karácsony, Adamis) - 4:56
"Valamit mindig valamiért" (Tamás Somló, Adamis) - 7:41

Side Two
"Mindenki" (Presser) - 5:53
"Ahogy mindenki" (Presser) - 3:31
"Rohanj hozzám" (Karácsony, Adamis) - 4:27
"Tiltott gyümölcs" (Somló, Adamis) - 5:05

Side Three
"Fiú" (Presser) - 3:39
"Ha a csend beszélni tudna" (Somló, Adamis) - 3:20
"Senki gyermekei" (Presser, Adamis) - 6.38
"Szelíd erőszak" (Somló, Adamis) - 2:19
"Ikarus 254" (Laux) - 6:30

Side Four
(Live Performance)
"Arra mennék én" (Presser) - 0:41
"És jött a doktor" (Presser) - 1:07
"Segíts elaludni!" (Presser, Adamis) - 1:41
"Ülök a járdán" (Somló, Adamis) - 2:02
"Az eső és én" (Somló, Adamis) - 5:28
"Várlak" (Presser) - 2:58
"Ezüst nyár" (Presser, Adamis) - 3:29
"Álomarcú lány" (Somló, Adamis) - 1:57
"Neked írom a dalt" (Presser) - 2:15

For the 1992 CD reissue, the album was fit onto one disc, but due to the format's length restrictions, the song "Ikarus 254" was not included.

Personnel
Gábor Presser - piano, clavinet, blues-harp, percussion, vocals
Tamás Somló - bass guitar, alto saxophone, harmonica, acoustic guitar, vocals
János Karácsony - electric guitar, acoustic guitar, bass guitar, vocals
József Laux - drums, percussion
Anna Adamis - lyrics
László Dely - percussion (conga, bongo, talking drum, maracas, guayo, afuche, agogo, cow bells, daves, tortuga, triangulum)
István Dely - percussion
Endre Sipos - trumpet
Károly Neumayer - trumpet
László Dés - tenor saxophone
István Gábor - tenor saxophone
István Bergendy - baritone saxophone
Károly Friedrich - trombone
László Gőz - trombone
Júlia Postásy - vocal
Éva Várszegi - vocal
Anthimos Apostolis - guitar

Production 
Attila Apró - Music director
György Kovács - Sound Engineer
László Nagyváry - Graphics

External links
Information at the official LGT website
Lyrics at the official LGT website
Information at the Hungaroton website

1976 albums